Roma is a commune in Botoșani County, Western Moldavia, Romania. It is composed of two villages: Cotârgaci and Roma.

References

Communes in Botoșani County
Localities in Western Moldavia